Withington railway station was a station in Withington, Herefordshire, England. The station was opened in 1861 and closed in 1961

References

Further reading

Disused railway stations in Herefordshire
Former Great Western Railway stations
Railway stations in Great Britain opened in 1861
Railway stations in Great Britain closed in 1961